"Margarita " - is a Soviet song written by Yury Chernavsky and Alexander Markevich. that was first released on Valery Leontiev album Wicked Way in 1990.

Editions
 Album Wicked Way (1990)
 Album There, in September (1995)
 Album The years of wandering (2009)
 Album Best songs 1 (Valery Leontiev) (1999)
 Album Best songs 2 (Valery Leontiev) (1999)
 Album Golden Collection of Russia (Valery Leontiev) (2000)
 Album The BEST of Valery Leontiev (2001)

External links 
 Video clip on the song 
 Valery Leontiev perform the song

1990 songs
Valery Leontiev songs
Soviet songs